Loretta Eleanor "Lori" Reynolds is a retired lieutenant general in the United States Marine Corps. She is the third woman to earn that rank in the Marine Corps.

Early life and education
Reynolds attended the Seton High School in Baltimore, Maryland, an all-girls Catholic school.  She was commissioned into the United States Marine Corps in May 1986 as a recent graduate of the United States Naval Academy. She is a native of Baltimore, Maryland and now resides in Kentucky.

Military career

1990s
As a communications officer, Reynolds was initially assigned to Communications Company, Headquarters Battalion, 1st Marine Division, Camp Pendleton, California. She was later assigned to Marine Wing Communications Squadron 18, 1st Marine Aircraft Wing in Okinawa, Japan, where she was the Detachment Alpha Executive Officer and Commanding Officer. From September 1991 until June 1994, Reynolds was a Project Officer at the Marine Corps Systems Command.

From July 1994 to May 1995, Reynolds attended the Command and Control Systems Course at Marine Corps University and went on to serve as a Candidate Platoon Commander for Charlie Company, Officer Candidate School in Quantico. In September 1995, Reynolds returned to Camp Pendleton to serve with the Ninth Communication Battalion, 1st Surveillance, Reconnaissance, and Intelligence Group. While there, she served as Assistant Operations Officer and Commanding Officer, Bravo Company.

2000s
From June 1997 to June 2000, Reynolds commanded the United States Marine Corps Recruiting Station in Harrisburg, Pennsylvania. From August 2000 until June 2001, she attended the Naval War College. Afterwards, Reynolds was assigned to Headquarters Marine Corps. There, she served as Action Officer and Deputy Division Head for Strategic Plans Division, Command, Control, Communications, and Computers Department from June 2001 to May 2003.

Reynolds assumed command of the 9th Communication Battalion on June 8, 2003. She deployed in support of Operation Iraqi Freedom to Fallujah, Iraq in February 2004 and returned to the United States in March 2005. During this deployment she was responsible for providing communications and IT support for I MEF. Reynolds later attended the United States Army War College and graduated in 2006. From 2006 to 2008 she served as a Desk Officer in Current Operations Division and as a Division Chief at the Joint Staff, J6 in Washington, D.C.

In March 2009, Reynolds assumed command of the I MEF Headquarters Group at Camp Pendleton. She deployed the Group to Camp Leatherneck in Afghanistan from March 2010 to March 2011, where the Group supported the efforts of I MEF FWD/Regional Command Southwest in Helmand Province.

2010s

In 2011 Reynolds took charge of the Marine Corps Recruit Depot Parris Island. In September 2015, she assumed command of Marine Corps Cyberspace Command at Fort Meade, Maryland. In May 2018, Reynolds was nominated for promotion to lieutenant general, and assignment as deputy Marine Corps commandant for information and commander of Marine Corps Forces Strategic Command. She was promoted to lieutenant general by the Assistant Commandant of the Marine Corps in July 2018.

She handed the DCI/COMMARFORSTRAT mantle to Matthew Glavy in July 2021.

References

Year of birth missing (living people)
Living people
Seton Keough High School alumni
United States Naval Academy alumni
Military personnel from Baltimore
United States Marine Corps personnel of the Iraq War
United States Marine Corps personnel of the War in Afghanistan (2001–2021)
Female generals of the United States Marine Corps
Recipients of the Defense Superior Service Medal
Recipients of the Legion of Merit
United States Army War College alumni
21st-century American women